IT industry is a major contributor the economy of Madurai. Software Technology Parks of India, an agency of the Government of India, has authorized several companies in Madurai to receive benefits under its national information technology development program. But still the city needs more investment and care to be taken with respect to growth in IT industry. Madurai houses multi-national corporations such as Honeywell Technologies India, HCL, Satyam , and Sutherland Global Services. Tamil Nadu government has established two IT- Special Economic Zone(SEZ)s in Madurai. Also Many MaduraiStartups  working with various products with real passion.

References

Economy of Madurai
Software companies of India